Judith Scott may refer to:

 Judith Scott (artist) (1943 – 2005), American fiber artist
 Judith Scott (American actress) (born 1965), American television actress
 Judith Scott (British actress) (born 1957), British theatrical, film and television actress